The 2014 OEC Taipei WTA Challenger was a professional tennis tournament played on indoor carpet courts. It was the seventh edition of OEC's Taipei Open tournaments, and the third under the 125k series classification. It was part of the 2014 WTA 125K series. It took place in Taipei, Taiwan, on 3–9 November 2014.

Singles entrants

Seeds 

 1 Rankings as of 27 October 2014

Other entrants 
The following players received wildcards into the singles main draw:
  Chan Hao-ching
  Chan Yung-jan
  Chang Kai-chen
  Hsieh Su-wei

The following players received entry from the qualifying draw:
  Shuko Aoyama
  Ana Bogdan
  Tamarine Tanasugarn
  Kateřina Vaňková

Withdrawals 
Before the tournament
  Sorana Cîrstea (replaced by Wang Yafan)
  Ksenia Pervak (replaced by Zhang Kailin)

Doubles entrants

Seeds

Champions

Singles 

  Vitalia Diatchenko def.  Chan Yung-jan 1–6, 6–2, 6–4

Doubles 

  Chan Hao-ching /  Chan Yung-jan def.  Chang Kai-chen /  Chuang Chia-jung 6–4, 6–3

References

External links 
 

2014 WTA 125K series
2014
Carpet court tennis tournaments
2014 in Taiwanese women's sport
2014 in Taiwanese tennis